is a Japanese football player for Kamatamare Sanuki on loan from JEF United Chiba.

Career
After attending, Sugiyama was picked by JEF United Chiba in July 2017, only to debut in J2 League in March 2018.

Club statistics
Updated to 1 January 2020.

References

External links

Profile at J. League
Profile at JEF United Chiba

1999 births
Living people
Association football people from Chiba Prefecture
Japanese footballers
J2 League players
J3 League players
JEF United Chiba players
Kataller Toyama players
Kamatamare Sanuki players
Association football defenders